Cantaure Formation may refer to:
 Cantaure Formation, Mexico, Neogene geologic formation of Mexico
 Cantaure Formation, Venezuela, Burdigalian geologic formation of Venezuela